Hellespontine Phrygia or Lesser Phrygia was a Persian satrapy (province) in northwestern Anatolia, directly southeast of the Hellespont. Its capital was Dascylium, and for most of its existence it was ruled by the hereditary Persian Pharnacid dynasty. Together with Greater Phrygia, it made up the administrative provinces of the wider Phrygia region.

History

The satrapy was created in the beginning of the fifth century BC, during the time of administrative reorganisations of the territories in western Asia Minor, which were amongst the most important Achaemenid territories. 

The first Achaemenid ruler of Hellespontine Phrygia was Mitrobates (ca. 525–522 BC), who was appointed by Cyrus the Great and continued under Cambises. He was killed and his territory absorbed by the satrap of neighbouring Lydia, Oroetes. Following the reorganization of Darius I, Mitrobates was succeeded by Oebares II (c.493), son of Megabazus.

Artabazus then became satrap circa 479 BC and started the Pharnacid dynasty, which would rule Hellespontine Phrygia until the conquests of Alexander the Great (338 BC).

As Alexander the Great was conquering and incorporating the Achaemenid Empire, he appointed Calas, a Macedonian General to govern Hellespontine Phrygia in 334 BC, after he had sent Parmenion to secure Dascylium, the provincial capital. Calas, being the very first non-Achaemenid ruler of the province, was awarded the Persian title of "satrap", rather than a Macedonian title, and Alexander instructed him to collect the same tribute from his subjects that had been paid to Darius III. After Alexander's death in 323, the satrapy was awarded to Leonnatus, who was killed in action in the Lamian War. The region was seized by Lysimachus, was added to the Seleucid Empire after the Battle of Corupedium (281 BC), and was finally integrated in the Bithynian kingdom.

Persian satraps of Hellespontine Phrygia

Achaemenid satraps

 Mitrobates (circa 520 BC)
 Megabazus (circa 500 BC)
 Oebares II (circa 493 BC)
 Artabazos I of Phrygia - r. 477 - 455 (?)
 Pharnabazus I - r. 455 (?) - before 430
 Pharnaces II - r. before 430 - after 422
 Pharnabazus II - r. before 413 - 387
 Ariobarzanes of Phrygia - r. 387-363/362
 Artabazos II - r. 363/362-353
 Arsites - r. 353-334

Alexandrian satraps
 Calas - r. 334-323
 Leonnatus - r. 323-321

References

Sources

External links
 

 
States and territories established in the 5th century BC
States and territories disestablished in the 4th century BC
Achaemenid satrapies in Anatolia